Brother Rice can refer to:

 Brother Rice High School in Bloomfield Hills, Michigan
 Brother Rice High School in Chicago, Illinois
 Edmund Ignatius Rice, the Irish missionary after which both of these schools are named.